Antonio de la Santísima Trinidad Pica Serrano (21 March 1933 — 26 April 2014) was a Spanish actor.

Pica died on 26 April 2014 at a hospital in El Puerto de Santa María, Spain.

Filmography

 A Fistful of Dollars (1964) - Rojo Gang Member (uncredited)
 Corrida pour un espion (1965) - (uncredited)
 Lola, espejo oscuro (1966)
 High Season for Spies (1966) - Stevens
 Comando de asesinos (1966)
 Target Goldseven (1966) - Alex, Erika's friend
 El hombre que mató a Billy el Niño (1967) - Mark Travis
 Due croci a Danger Pass (1967) - Sheriff Doug
 A Witch Without a Broom (1967)
 Django Kill (1967) - Templer Henchman (uncredited)
 Come rubare un quintale di diamanti in Russia (1967)
 Mister Dynamit - Morgen küßt euch der Tod (1967) - Flynn
 Bandidos  (1967) - Train Porter
 Encrucijada para una monja (1967) - Officer
 Dos hombres van a morir (1968) - Sheriff
 Un diablo bajo la almohada (1968) - Mr. Anderson
 Satanik (1968) - Louis La Roche
 Cuidado con las señoras (1968) - Jorge Rivera
 Death on High Mountain (1969)
 Hombre en la trampa (1969)
 Objetivo: bi-ki-ni (1969) - Miguel
 Pagó cara su muerte (1969)
 Hora cero: Operación Rommel (1969) - Lt. Thomas Mulligan
 El taxi de los conflictos (1969) - Novio de la hermana de Catalina
 Cry Chicago (1969) - Agent Lason
 A Bullet for Sandoval (1969) - Sam Paul
 Santo frente a la muerte (1969) - Igor's henchman
 S.O.S. invasión (1969) - Tío de Susana
 Santo contra los asesinos de la mafia (1970)
 Manos torpes (1970) - Ted
 Sin un adiós (1970) - Daniel - mánager de Mario
 Una señora llamada Andrés (1970) - Hern Screicher
 The Underground (1970)
 La orilla (1971) - Capitán Losada
 The Scalawag Bunch (1971)
 Españolas en París (1971)
 Delusions of Grandeur (1971) - Grand d'Espagne
 The Rebellious Novice (1971)
 Travels with my Aunt (1972) - Elegant Man
 The Heroes (1973) - Dietrich
 Los mil ojos del asesino (1973)
 Los Ojos Azules de la Muneca Rota (1973) - Inspector Pierre
 Vengeance of the Zombies (1973) - Superintendent Hawkins
 Santo contra el doctor Muerte (1973) - Peter
 El último viaje (1974) - Colombo
 Una mujer prohibida (1974) - Maître
 Blue Eyes of the Broken Doll (1974) - Inspector Pierre
 Una abuelita de antes de la guerra (1975) - Antonio
 The Mark of Zorro (1975) - Major André de Colignac
 Cry, Onion! (1975) - Hal Foster (uncredited)
 Tres suecas para tres Rodríguez (1975)
 El misterio de la perla negra (1976) - Andres Cortes
 Licántropo (1997) - Comisario Lacombe

References

External links

1933 births
2014 deaths
20th-century Spanish male actors
Spanish male film actors
People from Cádiz
Male actors from Andalusia
Male Spaghetti Western actors